Stacyville Township is a township in Mitchell County, Iowa, USA.

History
Stacyville Township was established in 1856.

References

Townships in Mitchell County, Iowa
Townships in Iowa